"The Summer" is a single released by ATB from his album Two Worlds.

CD single track listings

The Summer (Germany release 1) 
 "The Summer" (Airplay Mix) – 3:49
 "The Summer" (Clubb Mix) – 7:09
 "The Summer" (Instrumental Clubb Version) – 6:30
 "The Summer" (Ibiza Influence Version) – 5:31

The Summer (Germany release 2)
 "The Summer" (Airplay Mix) – 3:47
 "The Summer" (Clubb Mix) – 7:04

The Summer (Australia release)
 "The Summer" (Airplay Mix) – 3:49
 "The Summer" (Clubb Mix) – 7:09
 "The Summer" (Instrumental Clubb Version) – 6:30
 "The Summer" (Ibiza Influence Version) – 5:31
 "The Summer" (Enhanced Video)

The Summer (Portugal release)
 "The Summer" (Airplay Edit) – 3:49
 "The Summer" (Clubb Mix) – 7:09
 "The Summer" (Instrumental Clubb Version) – 6:30

Charts

References

2000 singles
ATB songs
Songs written by André Tanneberger
2000 songs
Number-one singles in Romania